Unfiltered Breathed In – The Truth About Aerotoxic Syndrome is an investigative documentary film by German journalist, author and filmmaker Tim van Beveren.

The film  deals with the technical, medical, social and political backgrounds of aerotoxic syndrome, which it portrays as a critical and controversial topic in today's aviation. A special focus is given to the analysis and scientific results of the forensic-pathological research conducted on the body of the British pilot Richard M. Westgate.

The world premiere took place on July 15, 2015, at the Babylon Cinema in Berlin. It was followed by a discussion with politicians, medical and legal experts as well as union representatives.

On October 12, 2015, the film was awarded "best documentary feature film" at the 2015 Great Lakes International Film Festival.

References

External links 
 
 

2015 films
2015 documentary films
German documentary films
Films set in Berlin
2010s English-language films
2010s German films